Bina Ramesh (born 28 August 1979 at Noumea) is a New Caledonian athlete who specialises in the Javelin. She is of Wallisian heritage.

Biography  
She won the bronze medal at the 1996 World Junior Championships and also at the 1997 Junior European Championships.

She won three French senior national Javelin championship titles in 1998, 2000 and 2004.

At the 2009 Pacific Mini Games in Rarotonga she won gold in the javelin. At the 2015 Pacific Games in Port Moresby she won silver.

Prize list  
 French Championships in Athletics   :  
 3-time winner of the javelin in 1998,  2000 and 2004.

Records

Notes and references 

  Docathlé2003, French Athletics Federation, 2003 p428

People from Nouméa
New Caledonian javelin throwers
French female javelin throwers
1979 births
Living people
New Caledonian female athletes